Red Emma's Bookstore Coffeehouse is a radical infoshop located in Baltimore, Maryland, United States and run by a worker-owner collective. Named for anarchist Emma Goldman, Red Emma's opened in November 2004 and sells fair trade coffee, vegetarian and vegan foods and books. The space also provides free computer access to the Baltimore community, wireless internet and film screenings, political teach-ins, and community events.

History 
Red Emma's was established in 2004 by Johns Hopkins University graduate students John Duda and Kate Khatib following the closure of a Fells Point district infoshop named Black Planet Books in 2003 due to declining business. The store operated from 800 St. Paul Street in Mount Vernon through 2013. It has moved twice since 2013. In 2013, formed a relationship with a coffee house named Thread that opened in 2012. In April 2021, it was announced that they would be purchasing and moving to two buildings in the Waverly neighborhood in Baltimore, at 415 E. 32nd Street and 3128 Greenmount Avenue. The location officially opened in October 2022.

2640
In March 2007, Red Emma's joined with St. John's United Methodist to form 2640, "a noncommercial, cooperatively managed space for radical politics and grassroots culture." The organization centers around management of the Charles Village church located at 2640 Saint Paul Street. In addition to Sunday services, the facility is used as a community space.

See also
List of anarchist communities

References

Further reading

External links

 

2004 establishments in Maryland
Anarchist collectives
Anarchist organizations in the United States
Coffeehouses and cafés in the United States
Companies based in Baltimore
Bookstores in Maryland
Emma Goldman
Infoshops
Worker cooperatives of the United States
Industrial Workers of the World in the United States
Anarchist bookstores
Socialism in Maryland
Independent bookstores of the United States